Semnan Space Center (Persian:) is the primary Iranian spaceport, located 50 km southeast of the city of Semnan in the north of the country.

History
Media attention on the space center began when Iranian authorities announced their intent to launch an artificial satellite within weeks on 16 August 2008. Reza Taghizadeh, head of the Iranian Aerospace Organization, told state television "The Safir (Ambassador) satellite carrier was launched today and for the first time we successfully launched a dummy satellite into orbit".

[[File:Launch Corridor of the Imam Khomeini Space Center.png|thumb|300px|A launching corridor to international waters in the Indian Ocean (incl. approx

Launch history

Launch sites

Circular launch platform

The circular launch platform is the oldest launch pad and also recognizable by the light blue background with the original logo of the Iran Space Agency (ISA).The platform has a simplified character and consists of a leveled terrain with a circular asphalted section of a diameter of 65 m, at the center of which is a service tower.

Main launch platform

The main launch platform (Imam Khomeini Space Launch Terminal) is located at the east of the complex on a specially enclosed octagonal area measuring 900 x 660 m and covering an area of 51.4 ha, representing the largest single element of the new space center. The units are accessed by a road from the northwest, which is within the perimeter of the three rays and forms two main inner zones – almost completely built lower and newly initiated upper (state of 2015).  The lower zone consists of spacious launching platforms with towers and four larger compartments for installation and storage.

References

Rocket launch sites
Space program of Iran